Can Alexander Öncü (born 26 July 2003) is a Turkish motorcycle racer. After spending the 2019 season in Moto3, for 2020 and 2021, he raced in the World Supersport with Turkish Racing Team, a new venture headed by Turkish former racer Kenan Sofuoğlu and supported by Pucetti Kawasaki and Orelac Racing.

After a change in regulations during 2018, he became the youngest Grand Prix motorcycle racing winner when he won the 2018 Valencian Community motorcycle Grand Prix aged 15 years, 115 days, and the first Turkish winner of a GP motorcycle road race.

In late 2018, he was included into the provisional entry list for the 2019 Moto3 season with the Red Bull KTM Ajo team, despite being younger than the usual minimum age requirement of 16.

His twin brother, Deniz Öncü, is also a motorcycle racer. Both brothers are mentored by Turkish multi-world champion motorcycle racer, Kenan Sofuoğlu.

Career

Early career 
Can and his twin brother, Deniz, competed in the Asia Talent Cup in 2016 (Can 9th, Deniz 10th) and 2017 (Can 3rd, Deniz 1st). Both entered the Red Bull MotoGP Rookies Cup in 2017 (Can 3rd, Deniz 4th) and Can became the Red Bull MotoGP Rookies Cup champion in 2018, while Deniz finished in second place.

For 2018, as well as competing in the Rookies Cup, both Can and Deniz joined Ajo Motorsport and also raced in the FIM CEV Moto3 Junior World Championship. Later that year, Can became the first rider to win on his Grand Prix debut since Noboru Ueda in 1991. He also broke the record, held for ten years by previous youngest Grand Prix race winner Scott Redding, at age 15 years, 115 days at the Valencian GP, when he was entered as a wildcard rider. Öncü benefited from a 2018 change to the FIM regulations, that added the current Red Bull Rookies Cup Champion to an exemption already given to the FIM Junior World Championship winner allowing them to compete in Moto3, a series normally requiring an adult licence, at a minimum age of 15 years rather than the usual 16 years.

Moto3 World Championship 
For 2019, Öncü made his full-season debut with Red Bull KTM Ajo. Despite his early promise shown as Red Bull Rookies champion and winning on his debut wildcard entry, Öncü struggled in the class, scoring only three points finishes from 16 contested races and finishing with 8 points in 31st position of the riders' championship. Öncü was dropped from the Ajo team at the end of the season.

Supersport World Championship 
For 2020, Öncü joined the Turkish Racing Team with Kawasaki in the Supersport World Championship. He achieved regular points finishes to complete the season in 12th place of the championship. He continued with the team for 2021, finishing regularly in the top 10 and taking his first podium at the French round.

Career statistics

FIM CEV Moto3 Junior World Championship

Races by year
(key) (Races in bold indicate pole position, races in italics indicate fastest lap)

Red Bull MotoGP Rookies Cup

Races by year
(key) (Races in bold indicate pole position, races in italics indicate fastest lap)

Grand Prix motorcycle racing

By season

By class

Races by year
(key) (Races in bold indicate pole position, races in italics indicate fastest lap)

Supersport World Championship

Races by year
(key) (Races in bold indicate pole position, races in italics indicate fastest lap)

 Season still in progress.

References

External links 

Living people
2003 births
People from Alanya
Sportspeople from Antalya
Turkish sportsmen
Turkish motorcycle racers
Moto3 World Championship riders
Supersport World Championship riders